The inaugural elections to Durham County Council took place in January 1889. Durham was divided into 72 electoral divisions, with candidates in 32 divisions being returned unopposed. The election saw control of the council being taken by Conservative candidates, although these candidates were largely Independent conservatives as opposed to being party activists.

Results

References

Durham
1889
19th century in County Durham
January 1889 events